TECO Energy Inc. is an energy-related holding company based in Tampa, Florida, and a subsidiary of Emera Incorporated. TECO Energy has several subsidiaries: Tampa Electric Company, which provides electricity to the Tampa Bay Area and parts of Central Florida; Peoples Gas Company, which provides natural gas throughout Florida; and TECO Services, which provides IT, HR, legal, facilities, and other services to current and former TECO subsidiaries.

History
Tampa Electric began in 1899 to manage electric trolley systems in the city of Tampa. On September 4, 2015, Emera, a utility holding company based in Halifax, Nova Scotia, Canada, announced the pending acquisition of TECO Energy. That purchase closed on July 1, 2016, and TECO Energy, Inc. is now a wholly owned subsidiary of Emera, Inc.

Environmental record

On July 6, 2019 People’s Gas a Division of Tampa Electric Company, caused an explosion of a shopping center in Plantation, Florida known as the Market on University because People’s Gas failed to close and lock a gas line after a customer request dating back to December 2018. The failure to close and lock the gas line is a violation of Federal law and Florida law. Peoples/TECO claims that a computer program cancelled the shutoff order unbeknownst to the utility. TECO/Peoples hid the claimed computer error from state investigators. The computer error caused hundreds of gas line shutoff orders to be cancelled system wide. TECO/Peoples also blame the owner of the shopping center for not capping the gas line when the tenant removed a gas pizza oven. Over 60 lawsuits were filed in response to the explosion many of which remain pending. 

In 2017, TECO had an explosion at its Big Bend power plant near Tampa, Florida killing 5 workers who were performing a dangerous procedure water jetting molten slag in a coal fired furnace. The workers were killed because an explosion occurred. TECO experienced the same type of accident 10 years prior and developed a policy to prevent future accidents but failed to train workers on the safety policy. In May 2022, TECO pleaded guilty to violating an OSHA safety regulation requiring a meeting to ensure workers are properly trained that would have prevented the deaths of the 5 workers. In August 2022 TECO was sentenced to a $500,000 fine and 3 years of probation. TECO admitted that it willfully violated an OSHA safety regulation as part of its guilty plea. 

In 2000, TECO Energy was fined $3.5 million for making changes to emissions producing facilities without installing new updated pollution controls. This led to the switch from coal to natural gas in one of its plants by 2004 and optimization of pollution controls in another. These changes were enacted to drastically cut emissions, notably sulfur dioxide and nitrogen oxide emissions.

TECO Energy completed a $330 million emissions control project in 2010, which made its Big Bend Power Station one of the cleanest coal-fired power plants in the nation. The renovation reduced nitrogen oxide emissions at the plant by approximately 91 percent from levels recorded in 1998.

Since 1998, TECO has invested $1.2 billion in improvements to the company's systems, including the re-powering of the previously coal-fired Bayside Power Station to natural gas and the addition of pollution controls on a second, reducing sulfur dioxide and nitrogen oxide emissions by more than 91 percent and carbon dioxide levels by 20 percent from 1998 levels.

On September 28, 2017, TECO announced it was adding 600 MW of solar to its electricity-producing portfolio.

See also
List of power stations in Florida
TECO Line Streetcar
Tampa Electric Co. v. Nashville Coal Co.

References

https://www.justice.gov/opa/pr/florida-power-company-sentenced-worker-death-case

External links

2016 mergers and acquisitions
Electric power companies of the United States
Companies based in Tampa, Florida
1899 establishments in Florida
Emera